Mustafa Özcan (born 1926, date of death unknown) was a Turkish long-distance runner who competed in the 1948 Summer Olympics.

References

1926 births
Year of death missing
Turkish male long-distance runners
Olympic athletes of Turkey
Athletes (track and field) at the 1948 Summer Olympics
Turkish male steeplechase runners
Mediterranean Games medalists in athletics
Mediterranean Games bronze medalists for Turkey
Athletes (track and field) at the 1951 Mediterranean Games
20th-century Turkish people